New York City, the largest and most populous city in the United States, has been the target of numerous acts of terrorism throughout the 20th and 21st centuries. The city, in particular, was one of the targets of the September 11 attacks, the single deadliest terrorist attack in history, which saw the destruction of the World Trade Center and the loss of 2,753 lives. The most recent fatal terrorist incident was a vehicle-ramming attack in Lower Manhattan, which killed eight people and injured eleven on October 31, 2017.

Incidents

20th century

21st century

References

Terrorist incidents
Lists of terrorist incidents in the United States
Terrorist incidents